Shivaji University, established in 1962, is a state university located at Kolhapur, Maharashtra, India. It was inaugurated on 18 November 1962 by Sarvepalli Radhakrishnan, the then president of India. Yashwantrao Chavan and Balasaheb Desai took the lead in establishing this university. One of the major objectives behind its foundation was to cater to the educational needs of South Maharashtra region. The University's efforts towards excellence are being recognised by the substantial grants received from funding agencies such as University Grants Commission (India), Department of Science and Technology (India), and DBT. The university is self reliant in water, which is stored on campus during the rainy season. It has a biodiversity-rich campus.

Shivaji University has recently signed MoU with Bhabha Atomic Research Centre for research in Material Science. It has also partnered with the Indian Institute of Geo-Magnetism, Mumbai and industries like Phyto-Pharma. Institutes including Maharashtra Police Academy at Nashik and Centre for Social Studies have sought affiliation with the Shivaji University.

Affiliations
In 1962 the University started functioning with 34 affiliated colleges and about 14,000 students with 5 Post-graduate Departments on the campus. Today the number of affiliated colleges has gone up to 293 and the student body has increased to 2,50,000 with 34 Postgraduate Departments on campus. The University imparts education in four major faculties of Humanities, Science and Technology, Commerce and Management and Faculty of Interdisciplinary Studies.

Educational institutions from Kolhapur, Sangli, and Satara districts come under its jurisdiction with 279 affiliated colleges and recognised institutes.

Shiv-Sandesh monthly bulletin is published online by Shivaji University, which throws light on various activities, programs organised in the university.

Madhyamvidya and Media Spectrum are private distribution newspapers published by M.A. Mass communication department students.

Barrister Balasaheb Khardekar Library
The Barr. B. Khardekar Library at Shivaji University is one of the leading university libraries in southern Maharashtra. It caters to the academic needs of students, faculty and other users from the university as well as visitors from other universities and institutes. The library has over 3.1 lakhs printed documents and it subscribes to over 298 national and international journals. The library is a member of UGC/INFONET Digital Library consortium of INFLIBNET Centre, under which it has access to over 6000+ electronic journals and few electronic databases. It has established contacts with universities, national and international organizations libraries for inter-library loans.

The library was named after the late Barr. Balasaheb Khardekar on 24 October 1981.

Notable alumni 
 Dnyaneshwar Mulay
 D. Y. Patil
 Nirmalya Kumar
 Uttam Kamble
 R. Madhavan
 Narendra Dabholkar
 Bharat Patankar
 P. A. Inamdar
 Sushilkumar Shinde
 R. R. Patil
 Sambhaji Raje Chhatrapati
 Satej Patil 
 Sai Tamhankar
 Tejaswini Sawant
 Sushilkumar Shinde
 Atul Kulkarni
 Vishwas Nangare Patil
 Y V Subba Reddy
 Virdhawal Khade
 Rahi Sarnobat
 Ganesh Bagler

Ranking
Shivaji University has been re-accredited by National Assessment and Accreditation Council,  (NAAC) with "A++" Grade (CGPA-3.52) (2021).

Vice chancellors 
Past and current vice chancellors

References

External links

 
Universities in Maharashtra
Education in Kolhapur
Monuments and memorials to Shivaji
Educational institutions established in 1962
1962 establishments in Maharashtra